Master Chief Petty Officer John-117, or "Master Chief", is a fictional character and the protagonist in the Halo multimedia franchise. Master Chief is a playable character in the series of military science fiction first-person shooter video games Halo: Combat Evolved, Halo 2, Halo 3, Halo 4, Halo 5: Guardians and Halo Infinite. The character also appears in Halo books and graphic novelsincluding Halo: The Fall of Reach, Halo: The Flood, Halo: First Strike, and Halo: Uprisingand has minor appearances or cameos in other Halo media.

The Master Chief is a towering supersoldier known as a "Spartan", raised and trained from childhood for combat. He is almost faceless as he is rarely seen without his green-colored armor and helmet. He is commonly referred to by his naval rank rather than his given birth name. The character is voiced by Steve Downes, a former Chicago disc jockey, in the video games in which he appears, while in alternate media outside the Halo games, he is portrayed by other actors, most notably Pablo Schreiber in the live-action Halo TV series. Downes based his personification of the Chief on an initial character sketch, which called for a Clint Eastwood–type character of few words. With each new appearance, the character's visual design underwent revamping or updates.

The Master Chief serves as a mascot for Halo and the Xbox brand. The character has received a generally positive reception; while some critics have described the Chief's silent and faceless nature as a character weakness, other publications have suggested these attributes better allow players to inhabit the character. Criticism of the Master Chief's lessened role in Halo 5 led to the developers at 343 Industries refocusing on him for Halo Infinite.

Character design

The task of developing Master Chief for the character's first video game appearance in developer Bungie's Halo: Combat Evolved (2001) fell on art director Marcus Lehto and Robert McLees. Shi Kai Wang was later hired for conceptual art. One of Wang's sketches became the basis for Master Chief, but the initial translation of the drawing into a three-dimensional model looked too slim and anime-inspired. Lehto felt the character needed to feel more like a walking tank, and the design was bulked up. The Chief's armor went through various changes, such as the addition (and later removal) of an antenna, and a green tint. The character's two-prong visor, intended to convey speed and agility, was inspired by BMX helmets.

Story writer Joseph Staten recalled that early on in Halos development, they had not considered how to engage players in the world, and Master Chief's character was what drew people in. The Chief was always intended to be a soldier in the last part of a long and bitter war. For much of the game's development, the character had no name, and early on was referred to as "Future Soldier" or "The Cyborg". Eric Nylund established the character's forename as "John" in the tie-novel Halo: The Fall of Reach, but Bungie did not want to use that in the game itself, instead looking to military ranks. Naval ranks grabbed them as "different" from ones the developers had heard of before. McLees, insisting on accuracy, wanted to make sure the character still had a plausible rank for his role. "Master Chief" was the highest non-commissioned rank where the character would still be considered "expendable"; McLees felt the shortened "Chief" sounded more colloquial and less like a modern military designation. Though the name was not universally liked and intended to be a placeholder, it ended up sticking.

After the success of Halo, Bungie began developing a sequel. According to Mclees, the developers wanted to "tone down" the look from Halo. In the story, Master Chief's armor receives an upgrade, and the character received a new look he sported for Halo 2 and Halo 3, with added damage and wear and tear included in the high-definition graphics of Halo3.

For Halo 4, 343 Industries took over development duties after Bungie spun off from Microsoft as an independent company. Halo4 made extensive use of motion capture for character animation, shooting in a studio that allowed multiple actors to interact. 343 looked for an actor to portray the Master Chief's physicality, while still conveying the emotions of the character. Bruce Thomas portrayed the Master Chief for motion capture sessions, focusing on giving the Master Chief a personality through actions that would be applied to the three-dimensional model; though his face and voice never appear in the final product, Creative director Josh Holmes credited Thomas with strongly influencing all the other performers for the game.

The Master Chief's armor was redesigned with the aim of making the player feel like they were inhabiting a character wearing hundreds of pounds of futuristic armor; art director Kenneth Scott emphasized finding a "sweet spot" where the armor remained familiar but still new. Real-world military vehicles inspired some of the details. The armor of Master Chief and his fellow elder Spartans was intended to look more utilitarian and tanklike, contrasting with the more streamlined look of newer characters. Despite the visual differences between the character's armor in Halo3 and Halo4, the developers intended it to canonically be the same armor.

343 Industries redesigned Master Chief's armor for Halo Infinite, drawing inspiration from his previous looks. Actor Bruce Thomas returned to provide motion capture for the character, as he had in Halo4 and Halo5.

Voice acting

Downes, who voices the Master Chief, is a disc jockey and voice actor who had never played video games before Halo. Downes's previous experience with video game voice work was a small part for Septerra Core: Legacy of the Creator. During production of Halo, Martin O'Donnell, Bungie's music director, recommended Downes for the part of the Chief based on his experience working with Downes on Septerra. Downes never interviewed for the part, describing his acceptance as a phone call.

After Halos success, Bungie briefly considered recasting the role with a celebrity before deciding against a change. Downes believed he came close to losing the role with Halo4 as well. "When I did my first 'demo' session for Halo4 in early 2012, I knew it was really an audition to see if I could carry the additional emotional weight that John was going to endure," he recalled. "I knew my future as the voice of Master Chief was on the line that day." Downes was more involved with the Halo4 sessions, seeing the script in advance for input and recording sessions in person over a longer duration, with him and Jen Taylor (Cortana) playing their roles in the same space for the first time.

For years Downes never appeared at Bungie or Microsoft events and believed the Master Chief was left masked because "[the character's identity] is really in the eye of the player." He has called the role the most rewarding of his voice acting career.

Attributes

Downes's voice for Master Chief was based on Bungie's character description, which specified a man of few words similar to Clint Eastwood. The actor noted that during recording, he was given creative leeway to develop the Chief's personality. In the early games, Master Chief rarely spoke during player-controlled gameplay, making him an almost-silent protagonist. Even during cutscenes, the character generally spoke sparingly. Joseph Staten felt that a focus on immersion was key to developing Master Chief's personality in the games, as "the less players knew about the Chief, we believed, the more they would feel like the Chief." As such, many of the lines written for Master Chief in the first game were eventually cut, as the more the character spoke, "the more chances there are that we’ll get it wrong for you, whoever you are." Eric Nylund recalled that some at Bungie wanted the tie-in novel The Fall of Reach cancelled because they felt it gave Master Chief too much of a distinct character.

The Master Chief has a close relationship with the artificial intelligence construct Cortana, whom he meets just prior to the fall of the human colony Reach before the events of Combat Evolved. Cortana was created as a game design requirement to guide the character as Master Chief throughout the game world, but she became an important aspect of revealing the Chief's humanity. "Over time, Cortana became a fully realized charactera friend and companion to the Chief, not to mention the only person to poke revealing holes in his tough-guy exterior," Staten recalled. The game designers crafted the player experience of the first game to focus on abandonment and loneliness in many levels, as it reinforced the plot point that many of the Chief's friends were killed before the game began.

For Halo 4, 343 Industries consciously decided to treat Master Chief as less of a vessel for the players, exploring the character as a human being facing new challenges and threats. Creative director Josh Holmes cited the video game Ico as an inspiration for the Chief-Cortana relationship in Halo4, noting that it emphasized how to tell a story without dialogue. He described the challenge with the character thusly:
What we were striving for with Master Chief in Halo4 was right in the middle, and I describe it as a marriage of player and protagonist. There has to be enough space within the character for you to feel you can inhabit it as a player. And also, just from the standpoint of personality, Chief is a stoic character. He's a man of few words. If he speaks too much, it goes against his innate persona. And yet if we don't have him speak at all, there's no way to really understand his mind and you can't chart his growth as a characterhe becomes dull and one-dimensional.

In the video games, the Master Chief is rarely seen without his armor. To aid players in identifying with the character, cutscenes tease the character's face, but never fully reveal it. At the end of Halo: Combat Evolved, the Chief removes his helmet, but camera movement hides his head, while at the end of Halo 4, Master Chief's eyes are briefly shown if the game is played on the highest difficulty. O'Connor said in an interview that revealing the face of the Chief is not as important as revealing the events going on around the character.  In Halo: The Flood, the Chief is described as tall with short brown hair, serious eyes, and strong features. His skin is unnaturally pale as a consequence of spending most of his time in his armor. The Master Chief stands about 7feet (2.13m) tall and weighs 1,000 pounds (450kg) in armor; without it, he stands 6feet, 10inches (2.08m) tall and weighs 287pounds (130kg).

Appearances

Video games

The Master Chief's backstory is revealed in the 2001 novel The Fall of Reach. Born in 2511 on the human colony world of Eridanus II, John and other selected children are covertly taken from their homes and conscripted by the United Nations Space Command (UNSC) into the SPARTAN-II Project. The military and the SPARTAN-II Project's lead, Doctor Catherine Halsey, believe humanity will fall into interstellar civil war without the creation of supersoldiers (the Spartans). John proves a natural leader and leads his fellow trainees over eight years of grueling training and dangerous physical augmentation. A new threat emerges: the Covenant, a collective of alien races determined to exterminate humanity. Though the Spartans prove effective against the Covenant, they are too few to turn the tide in the UNSC's favor.

Master Chief first appears in the games with Halo: Combat Evolved. Master Chief and the crew of the UNSC ship Pillar of Autumn discover the alien ringworld Halo. Master Chief is entrusted with safeguarding Cortana, the ship's artificial intelligence, from capture. While fighting the Covenant, Master Chief and Cortana learn that an ancient race known as the Forerunners created Halo as a last line of defense against an alien parasite called the Flood, which begins to spread across the ring. Learning that Halo's activation kills all life in the galaxy to prevent the Flood's spread, the Master Chief and Cortana destabilize Pillar of Autumns fusion reactor—destroying it and Halo. Master Chief and Cortana escape in a fighter spacecraft. In the 2003 novel Halo: First Strike, Master Chief and Cortana pick up survivors from Halo and reunite with Halsey and more Spartans. Learning the Covenant has discovered Earth's location, Master Chief leads a preemptive strike against a Covenant fleet.

Master Chief returns to Earth in Halo 2 (2004), defending the planet from Covenant attack. Pursuing a fleeing Covenant vessel, Master Chief and the crew of the human ship In Amber Clad discover another Halo ring. Master Chief falls into the clutches of the Flood intelligence known as a Gravemind, who forges an alliance between them and the disgraced Covenant commander known as the Arbiter. The Gravemind sends them to stop Halo's activation—Master Chief is sent to High Charity, a Covenant space station serving as their capital city, then in Halo's orbit. Cortana remains behind on High Charity to ensure the ring is destroyed if activated. At the same time, Master Chief pursues the remaining Covenant leader, the Prophet of Truth, aboard a Forerunner ship. Truth heads to Earth, intent on activating the Halo Array remotely from a place known as the Ark.

During the events of Halo 3 (2007), Master Chief reunites with the Arbiter to stop Truth. Master Chief and Arbiter pursue him through a portal to the Ark, located beyond the Milky Way. On the Ark, the Flood-controlled High Charity crashes into the installation. Master Chief stops the Halo Array from firing and battles through the wreckage of High Charity to rescue Cortana. Together, they activate replacement Halo being built on the Arkstopping the Flood while sparing the galaxy at large. Escaping aboard the UNSC ship Forward Unto Dawn, the section of the ship with Master Chief and Cortana is set adrift in space while the Arbiter makes it to Earth.

Master Chief does not appear in the games Halo 3: ODST and Halo: Reach, save for a cameo easter egg in Reach. The character returns as the playable protagonist in 2012's Halo 4. After years adrift in space, Cortana awakens Master Chief from cryonic sleep as the Forward Unto Dawn approaches a Forerunner installation, Requiem. Hoping to prevent the UNSC ship Infinity from being drawn into Requiem like them, Master Chief and Cortana attempt to activate what they believe is a communications relay; instead, Master Chief awakens the Didact, a Forerunner who hated humanity and intended to resume his war against them. Master Chief and Cortana pursued the Didact, and Cortana sacrifices herself to stop his attack on Earth.

Master Chief reunites with his fellow Spartans of Blue Team in a 2014 arc of the comic series Escalation. During the events of Halo 5: Guardians (2015), Master Chief is contacted by Cortana, directing him to the human colony of Meridian. Master Chief and Blue Team disregard their orders and head to the planet, leading the UNSC to dispatch another group of Spartans, Fireteam Osiris, to bring them in. Blue Team board a buried Forerunner construct known as a Guardian and are transported to the Forerunner planet Genesis. Cortana reveals her survival resulting from the Forerunner repository of knowledge known as the Domain. After Master Chief realizes Cortana's new plans for the galaxy would mean authoritarian rule, Cortana imprisons him and Blue Team in stasis as she rallies human AIs to her cause and deploys Guardians around the galaxy as enforcers of her new order. Through the efforts of Fireteams Osiris, Master Chief and Blue Team are rescued, but forced to retreat as Cortana puts her plans in motion. The novel Halo: Bad Blood (2018) details the events immediately following Halo5. He returns in Halo Infinite (2021) as the main playable character, where after Cortana's defeat, he works with the Weapon, an AI modelled after Cortana, to stop a faction of space pirates known as the Banished from activating a Halo ring.

Live action

Master Chief would have appeared in the cancelled Halo film. Director Neill Blomkamp said the film would have depicted the character as "the most important supporting cast member" because of his faceless nature, with other characters exploring their perception of the Chief. The character would make his live-action debut in the 2012 film Halo 4: Forward Unto Dawn. Master Chief is portrayed by Daniel Cudmore, while the voice is provided by Alex Puccinelli. In the 2022 Halo television series, the character is played by Pablo Schreiber. Master Chief takes off his helmet in the series, as part of an effort to make the audience empathize with the character.

Other appearances
The Master Chief is a major character in the novels Silent Storm (2018), Oblivion (2019), and Shadows of Reach (2020), written by Troy Denning. The character also appears in the 2010 animated anthology Halo Legends, as well as the comics The Halo Graphic Novel, Halo: Uprising, Halo: Collateral Damage, and Halo: Tales from Slipspace. Peter David's graphic novel Helljumpers contains a cameo by the Master Chief "before he actually was [the Chief]".

The character appears outside Halo canon, with guest appearances as a playable character in the Xbox One version of Super Bomberman R, and a cosmetic outfit in the battle royale game Fortnite, marking his only appearance on Nintendo and PlayStation. A medieval variation of the Master Chief's armor appears in Fable II, as the suit of armor worn by a legendary hero named "Hal". Team Ninja approached Bungie and asked to use the Master Chief in their 2006 video game Dead or Alive 4. Although the Chief could not be used due to storyline restrictions, Bungie's interest in the idea resulted in the development of Nicole (Spartan-458). The character is referenced in Rooster Teeth Productions' Halo-based machinima parody series Red vs. Blue.

Influences and analysis
IGN saw in the Master Chief elements of Jon 6725416, a character in Christopher Rowley's novel Starhammer. Other reviewers have suggested that the name John-117 could be a Biblical reference. Michael Nitsche of the Georgia Institute of Technology found similarity to Gordon Freeman, the protagonist of Valve's Half-Life series of FPS video games: "[Both characters] are the independent, individualistic, and often lonely heroes that gain admiration by constantly proving their superiority... in technology-driven, hostile, often closed spaces."

Roger Travis, associate professor of classics at the University of Connecticut, compared Master Chief to the epic hero Aeneas, in that both superhuman characters save a civilization by defeating strong enemies in a martial setting. The audience is intended to identify with the protagonist similarly in both stories. Matthew Stover compared Halo to the Iliad, saying both stories share the meta-theme that "war is the crucible of character". As military science fiction, Halo further raises the issue of being human. Stover argued that, since players are to imagine themselves as the Master Chief, the character is correctly presented as a cyborg, neither a flawless machine nor fully human. Players would be unable to empathize with the former, and the latter would be too specifically developed. This immersion has facilitated the use of the Halo series' multiplayer mode for live digital puppetry, as in Chris Burke's machinima talk show This Spartan Life.

Cultural impact

Merchandise
BusinessWeek listed the Master Chief among several video game characters who have been branded beyond their respective video games, "helping them transcend the very medium in the process". The Master Chief has been used in marketing on a variety of products, from 7-Eleven Slurpees to T-shirts, controllers to Mountain Dew, and costumes to motorcycle helmets. Several action figures of the character have been created to market of the Halo series, including lines by McFarlane, Jazwares, 1000toys, and Mega Bloks. One2One collectibles produced 1:2 scale busts of the Master Chief.

Marketing for the video games focused heavily on the character of the Master Chief, including "The Museum", part of Halo3s "Believe" campaign, the Halo4 live-action trailer "Scanned", Halo5s Hunt the Truth, and Infinites "Become" campaign. The heavy merchandising was considered necessary for the game franchise; Ed Ventura, director of Xbox's worldwide marketing, said, "We want to be in the hearts and minds of our fans as much as we can."

Reception
In an article in Time, Lev Grossman said the Master Chief represents a "new kind of celebrity for a new and profoundly weird millennium" and was a symbol of the increasing legitimacy of video games as an art form. IGN, Kotaku, Glixel, GamesRadar and The Sydney Morning Herald described the Chief as "iconic". Master Chief has been called the de facto symbol for the Xbox console, Microsoft, and for a generation of gamers. The recognition of Master Chief has spread to mainstream culture; Madame Tussauds in Las Vegas has developed a wax sculpture of the Chief. At the ceremony, Pete Wentz of Fall Out Boy called the Master Chief a hero of the times as much as characters like Spider-Man and Luke Skywalker were for previous generations. Downes realized his character was such a huge hit only after children lined up around the block for his autograph a year after the game shipped.

The character has appeared on lists of the best video gaming characters by UGO, Empire, GamesRadar, Guinness World Records Gamer's Edition, Complex, and Time. IGN suggested that the dramatic death of the character could be one of the most powerful events in gaming. The faceless nature of the character has alternatively been praised and criticized, with the character called overrated. Writing for The Artifice, Sam Gray argued the character uncomfortably straddled the divide between silent and active protagonist, and the lack of character conflict made him uninteresting. O'Connor noted that given players invest the character with much of his meaning, there is a tension between players who prefer more personality and those who prefer "a sort of paragon of useful emptiness".

The more character-focused portrayal of Chief in Halo4 was positively received. Todd Martens of the Los Angeles Times called Halo4 a more introspective Halo game, and the first to explore the motivations and emotions of the Master Chief. Reviews that found the game's story otherwise hard to follow praised the focus on fleshing out the character and Chief and Cortana's relationship.

Halo 5 received backlash from fans about Master Chief's reduced role in the story, as he appeared in fewer story missions compared to Fireteam Osiris. Kotakus Stephen Totilo wrote that the confrontation between Locke and Master Chief felt "under-cooked", and the plot point of a rogue Master Chief more effectively explored in Hunt the Truth. O'Connor promised the studio would refocus on Chief in future media. Due to the amount of disappointment for his lessened role, 343 had redesigned his character for Halo Infinite, which was positively received by the community.

References

External links

 The Master Chief's profile at Bungie.org
 The Master Chief's profile  at Halowaypoint.com
 John-117’s profile at halopedia.org

Cryonically preserved characters in video games
Cyborg characters in video games
Fictional chief petty officers
Fictional gunfighters in video games
Fictional special forces personnel
Fictional super soldiers
Halo (franchise) characters
Male characters in video games
Microsoft protagonists
Fictional military personnel in video games
Space marines
Fictional war veterans
Fictional soldiers in video games
Video game characters introduced in 2001
Video game characters with superhuman strength
Video game mascots
First-person shooter characters
Spike Video Game Award winners
Fictional characters with superhuman strength